Han Feng (韩锋), born in Qinzhou, Guangxi, People's Republic of China, was a member of the Communist Party of China and a senior official of the China National Tobacco Corporation.  In early 2010, he was fired and expelled from the party due to corruption and his love life being exposed on the internet from his diary.  The scandal soon became one of the most popular stories in Chinese cyberspace.  Despite the scandal and arrest, most netizens overwhelmingly believe Han Feng is a good CPC official.

Career
Han originally attended Guangxi University and studied Chinese language.  After graduation he went to Shangsi County and was selected as Qinzhou office secretary.  After 1988 he became the tobacco secretary of the Guanxi region. Ten years later he became a director of the China National Tobacco Corporation.  He married one of his classmates who also worked in a tobacco bureau.  On February 26, 2003, he was made head director of its Laibin municipal bureau.  In 2009 he was transferred to the Guangxi tobacco monopoly bureau as a director of the sales division.

Scandal
Han Feng kept a Pepysian diary with entries covering his daily activities from January 1, 2007, to June 10, 2008, with a total of more than 500 entries.  It featured graphical sex accounts with mistresses between bribes and banquets.  At the time he was the director of the Laibin tobacco monopoly bureau.

According to Guangzhou-based Southern Metropolis Weekly (南都周刊)., the diary first appeared online on November 23, 2009.  After a four-month cycle of repeated postings and deletions, by the end of February 2010, the news finally broke across almost every major Chinese web portal.

Arrest
On March 13, 2010, Han Feng was arrested and expelled from the Communist party.  After investigation, Han, at the age of 53, was removed from his tobacco bureau division chief post for allegedly accepting bribes totaling 482,000 yuan.  He also accepted an apartment worth 300,000 yuan.  The diary itself documented 275,000 yuan in just under two years.  The bribes were taken between 2002 and 2010.

Responses
A star blogger, Han Han wrote a post titled "Han Feng is a good cadre" which commented on the online leak of the diary.  The blogger said that Han Feng was a good official since the amount of bribes and number of sexual relationships he had was no comparison to other Communist party officials. He then conducted an online survey and concluded that 96% of 210,000 voters with independent IP addresses felt Han Feng was a good official.

Other responses from Tianya Club said the diary is a great text.  It has done a greater job than any recent literary work or news reports in vividly presenting the typical life of a Chinese official, and the real situation of officialdom as well as male-female relationships in second- and third-tier cities in China.  Others responded that the Chinese people's requirements for officials are generally low. Others said this "double-faced" life is not unique to Han Feng, but all 80 characters in the diary.  Political commentator Qin Geng said "Han Feng is surely not the worst official in China, that he could even be considered to be one of the good ones.  That is the most fearful part of the story".

References

External links
 Diary entry

Businesspeople from Guangxi
People from Qinzhou
Living people
Tobacco in China
Year of birth missing (living people)